Gomez are an English indie rock band from Southport, comprising Ian Ball (vocals, guitar), Paul "Blackie" Blackburn (bass), Tom Gray (vocals, guitars, keyboards), Ben Ottewell (vocals, guitars) and Olly Peacock (drums, synths, computers). The band has three singers and four songwriters, employing traditional and electronic instruments. Their music covers the genres of blues, indie, alternative, rock, folk, psychedelic and experimental.

History

Formation (1995–1997)
Guitarist and vocalist Ian Ball and drummer Olly Peacock are long-time friends, having played in a three piece band from the ages of 14 to 18. They met bassist Paul Blackburn and multi-instrumentalist Tom Gray, who had grown up two doors down from Peacock, at college. Finally, Ian Ball met vocalist/guitarist Ben Ottewell from Matlock Bath in Derbyshire at Sheffield University.

The band played its first gig together in 1996 in Leeds at the Hyde Park Social Club on Ash Grove. At the time, they did not have a formal name. The band left a sign out which read "Gomez in here", for a friend of theirs whose surname was Gomez, to indicate that it was the site of their first gig. People saw the sign and assumed that the band's name was Gomez. The name stuck.

The band started recording four-track demos in Peacock's father's garage in Southport during the summer of 1996. The demos were handed to Stephen Fellows (later manager/Comsat Angels) who distributed them to four initial record labels. A bidding war erupted immediately, including several US labels. The band, having only one performance under their belt, decided against playing showcases in London and instead made the record companies travel to Red Tape rehearsal studios. After several weeks of playing to over 25 labels, the band finally signed to Hut Records (Virgin Records), in September 1997.

Bring It On (1997–1998) 

After signing to Hut Records in September 1997, they began recording their debut album. They entered Parr Street Studios with engineer Ken Nelson (later Badly Drawn Boy, Coldplay) recording new songs and improving the mixes of the demos. The band self produced. The album went platinum. A season of English Festivals (including two performances at Glastonbury) followed. The band's successful year was crowned when they won the Mercury Music Prize in September 1998. Other nominees included Massive Attack – Mezzanine, Pulp – This Is Hardcore, The Verve – Urban Hymns.

In 1998, Philips Electronics chose Gomez to cover The Beatles' song "Getting Better" for a $100 million ad campaign for Philips new lines of flat panel and high-definition television sets. The cover song was not released on an album until 2000 with Abandoned Shopping Trolley Hotline, a collection of B-sides and rarities.

Liquid Skin (1999–2000) 

The band's second album, Liquid Skin, was released in 1999, lending Gomez further success on the British and Australian albums charts. The band also made the Billboard Heatseeker chart for the first time. After winning the Mercury Prize, the band went back to Parr Street Studios, pressing on with recording as much material as they could between tours. Ken Nelson engineered once again and the band self produced. The album went Platinum and touring followed, including a performance at Glastonbury Festival on the second stage.

In Our Gun (2000–2003) 

The group's third album, In Our Gun, was released in 2002. It made the top 10 on the UK charts as well as the top 50 on the Australian charts. The single "Shot Shot" charted in the UK top 40, the top 20 in Portugal, and the Billboard Heatseeker chart. The band produced and recorded the record in Batsford Manor, Gloucestershire with additional recordings in the famous Studio 2 at Abbey Road Studios. Giving the album a perfect score in his review for PopMatters, Matt Cibula wrote "everyone who doesn’t like this record is insane in a bad way. Screw Wilco; In Our Gun is sounding very much like the Album of the Year."

Split the Difference (2004–2005) 

While Gomez's first three albums had been self-produced, the band decided to work with Tchad Blake as producer for their fourth record. Blake had previously produced albums by Tom Waits, Crowded House and Pearl Jam. The band were massive fans of his compressed sounds inherent on Los Lobos and Latin Playboys recordings. The album was met with mixed critical response, with Allmusic rating it as four stars out of five and BBC Internet Music Reviews describing it as "one of the finest releases of the year so far. If you were one of those people who wrote them off two years ago, it's time to get listening again."  However, the album received less than favourable reviews from a number of other sources, including Pitchfork Media and NME.

The band had built a Studio in Portslade, just outside Brighton, England (where most of them were residing). They worked independently for months recording, until they developed what the record would be with Tchad Blake at Real World Studios.In 2007, Gomez recorded a cover of The Band's hit "Up On Cripple Creek" for the tribute album Endless Highway: The Music of The Band. Also their song "How We Operate" was played in the final scene of The Hitcher starring Sean Bean and Sophia Bush. Gomez continued to tour, including a co-headlining 2007 US tour with label-mate Ben Kweller. The band toured Australia and New Zealand before heading back to the States for a second headlining leg of their US tour. On 2 March 2007, Gomez recorded a concert at the Vic Theater in Chicago, IL that was streamed via MSN Music. Vocalist and songwriter Ian Ball released a solo project, with an album entitled Who Goes There. In 2008, Gomez opened up several shows for Dave Matthews Band. The album reached the top 40 in the UK and Australia. The first single "Catch Me Up" entered the UK top 40 in March 2004 and "Silence" was released as the second single.

Unfortunately for Gomez, Virgin/EMI closed down Hut Recordings and, having had such a strong bond to their friends at the label, the band asked to be released from their contract. Virgin agreed.

How We Operate (2006–2007) 

Gomez's fifth studio record, How We Operate was produced by Gil Norton (Foo Fighters, Pixies) and released on 2 May 2006. The record was developed in the band's Studio and later recorded in 6 weeks at RAK Studios, London. The album's title track was featured in the Grey's Anatomy episode "Deterioration of the Fight or Flight Response", and later covered by Kevin McKidd in the season seven episode "Song Beneath the Song". On 14 February 2006 their song "Get Miles" was featured in the House episode "Distractions", and on 6 March 2007, their song "See the World" was featured in the House episode "Half-Wit". "See the World" was also featured in the "Bones" episode "Widow's Son in the Windshield".

In 2005, Gomez signed a new deal with Dave Matthews' (of the Dave Matthews Band) ATO Records. Under a new label, the band released their first live album, Out West in June 2005. The double disc CD was compiled from shows recorded at San Francisco's famous Fillmore Theater in January 2005. In January 2006, the band performed on Jam Cruise before returning to the studio to put the final touches on How We Operate. After playing the SxSW music festival in Austin, Tom, Ian and Ben debuted material from the upcoming release in several US cities. The band's 2006 spring tour included stops in Asheville NC, Chicago, Minneapolis, Kansas City, Denver, San Francisco, and Portland, OR. They also performed at several large outdoor festivals, including stops at the Beale Street and Bonnaroo Festivals in Tennessee, the Jazzfest in New Orleans and Sasquatch Festival in George, WA.

A collection of A-side and B-sides and rarities titled Five Men in a Hut was released on 17 October 2006. The two-disc album consists of released and unreleased tracks recorded under the Hut/Virgin label from 1998–2004. A DVD with music videos and interviews from their time with Hut was also released. They were also one of the many bands featured on a John Lennon Tribute aired on BBC Radio 2 to mark the 25th anniversary of the musician's death. Gomez performed "Hey Bulldog" by The Beatles, and "Instant Karma!" by Lennon. "How We Operate" is also the ending song to the 2007 remake of the horror film The Hitcher, and acts as the title music for the pilot episode of The Riches.

A New Tide (2008–2010) 

As ever, a wide range of styles were incorporated into Gomez' sound for their next record A New Tide, including blues, Krautrock and psychedelia. The record also saw Gomez accompanied by a number of guest musicians, including vocalist Amy Millan (of Stars/Broken Social Scene), bassist Josh Abrams (The Roots, Sam Prekop, Godspeed You Black Emperor!), cellist Oliver Krauss (Tom McRae, David Gray, Paul Weller, Beth Orton), and multi-instrumentalist Stuart Bogie of Brooklyn's world-renowned Antibalas Afrobeat Orchestra.

On 21 December the band revealed to their mailing list that a new album entitled A New Tide would be released on 31 March in the US, in the UK and Europe on 30 March, and in Australia on 28 March 2009. Gomez recorded A New Tide in Chicago, and played festivals including Lollapalooza that year. The album marked a return to the British band's more experimental roots, in particular songs such as "Win Park Slope" and "Airstream Driver". With this album, the band were careful to create a collection of songs that would stand up well at live gigs. With the band members now scattered across two continents, from Brooklyn to Brighton, England, early tracks were written and recorded individually and then merged online. The process allowed for an open and adaptive songwriting approach, the material taking on its ultimate shape when Gomez officially convened in studios in Chicago and Charlottesville, VA, with producer Brian Deck (Modest Mouse, Iron and Wine, Counting Crows).

In early 2004, Ian Ball and Olly Peacock were involved in a project called Operation Aloha with 14 other musicians including members from Phantom Planet and Maroon 5. They produced an album over the course of 30 days in Maui, Hawaii. A self-titled album was released on 12 May 2009.

In April 2009, the band's song "Little Pieces" was used in the 19th episode of Grey's Anatomy season 5. It played at the start of the episode and involved a montage of Alex watching Izzie sleep in hospital, as well as Callie dancing with Arizona around Callie's apartment. In June 2009, Gomez opened for Pearl Jam on the European leg of the Backspacer Tour.

Whatever's on Your Mind (2011–2020) 

Gomez released their seventh studio album, Whatever's on Your Mind, on 21 June 2011. As with their last album, production on Whatever's on Your Mind was overseen by the band as well as Brian Deck, known for his work on albums from bands such as Modest Mouse, Counting Crows and Iron & Wine.

Current activities (2020-present) 
Since 2020, Tom Gray has been lobbying the British government to regulate music streaming with his Broken Record campaign group.

Members

 Ian Ball (vocals, guitar)
 Ben Ottewell (vocals, guitar)
 Paul Blackburn (bass)
 Tom Gray (vocals, guitar, keyboards, programming)
 Olly Peacock (drums, percussion)

Discography

Studio albums

Live albums

Compilations

EPs

Singles

1 Charted on the UK Indie Chart at No. 42.
2 Was released as a US only single

Videos

Other contributions
The Saturday Sessions: The Dermot O'Leary Show (2007) – "Wichita Lineman"
Dermot O'Leary Presents the Saturday Sessions (2011) – "The Only Living Boy in New York"
Triple J Like a Version, Vol. 3 – "Breakfast in America"
Endless Highway: The Music of The Band – "Up On Cripple Creek"
The Lone Ranger: Wanted (2013) – "Butch's Ballad"

References

External links
 
 Gomez collection at the Internet Archive's live music archive
 
 Interview with Tom Gray on SomethingGlorious.com
 Gomez Concerts and Interviews at NPR Music
 Interview with Ben Ottewell

English rock music groups
Post-Britpop groups
Musicians from Southport
English indie rock groups
ATO Records artists
Virgin Records artists
MapleMusic Recordings artists
Independiente Records artists